Jung Ho-seok  (born February 18, 1994), better known by his stage name J-Hope (stylized as j-hope), is a South Korean rapper, singer-songwriter, dancer, and record producer. He made his debut as a member of South Korean boy band BTS in 2013, under Big Hit Entertainment.

J-Hope released his first solo mixtape, Hope World, in 2018. It was received positively by critics and peaked at number 38 on the US Billboard 200, the highest-charting album by a Korean solo artist at the time. He became the first member of BTS to enter the Billboard Hot 100 as a soloist in 2019, when his single "Chicken Noodle Soup", featuring singer Becky G, debuted at number 81. In 2022, J-Hope released his debut studio album Jack in the Box. In 2023, he released his single "On the Street" with J. Cole.

Early life and education 
J-Hope was born Jung Ho-seok on February 18, 1994, in Gwangju, South Korea, where he lived with his parents and older sister, Jung Ji-woo.

In March 2019, J-Hope enrolled at Hanyang Cyber University for the Master of Business Administration program in Advertising and Media. He previously graduated from Global Cyber University with a degree in Broadcasting and Entertainment.

Career

1994–2012: Beginnings 
Before debuting with BTS, J-Hope was part of an underground dance team called Neuron, and took dance classes at Gwangju Music Academy for six years, from fourth grade to his first year in high school when he signed with Big Hit Entertainment. He was relatively well known for his dance skills, and won various local prizes, including first place in a national dance competition in 2008. His dancing eventually led to an interest in singing, and he auditioned to become an idol trainee. While a trainee, J-Hope appeared as a featured rapper on singer Jo Kwon's song "Animal", released in 2012.

2013–present: BTS 

On June 13, 2013, J-Hope made his debut as a member of BTS on M! Countdown. He was the third member to join the band as a trainee after RM and Suga. Under the band's name he has released three solo songs: "Intro: Boy Meets Evil", "Mama", and "Trivia 起: Just Dance". The first two were released in 2016 as part of BTS' second studio album Wings. Lyrically, "Boy Meets Evil" was about "the thoughts of a boy faced with the evil that is temptation" and showcased J-Hope's rapping abilities, while "Mama" was a "quirky hip-hop" ode of appreciation to his mother that "captures his animated delivery and onstage style. "Just Dance", released in 2020 on the band's fourth studio album Map of the Soul: 7, was a "funky hip-hop" song that "uses the titular activity as a metaphor for love".

J-Hope also collaborated with bandmate V and  Swedish singer Zara Larsson on the single "A Brand New Day" for the BTS World soundtrack. It was released on June 14, 2019.

2018–present: Solo activities 

J-Hope released his first solo mixtape, Hope World, worldwide on March 1, 2018. It was accompanied by a music video for the lead single "Daydream". A music video for the B-side single "Airplane" was released on March 6. The mixtape debuted at number 63 and peaked at number 38 on the Billboard 200, making him the highest-charting Korean solo act on the ranking at the time. Six of the album's tracks entered the World Digital Song Sales chart, with "Daydream" topping the chart and making J-Hope one of only ten Korean artists, including BTS, to reach number one. The success of his solo debut led to him ranking at number three on the Emerging Artists chart and peaking at number 91 on the Artist 100; he became the fifth Korean artist and second Korean soloist (after Psy) to chart on the latter. Hope World charted in ten countries worldwide, and "Daydream" charted in three. The mixtape ranked at number five on Billboards year-end World Albums Chart for 2018. In celebration of Hope Worlds third anniversary, J-Hope released the full version of its closing track "Blue Side (Outro)" for free via BTS' SoundCloud page on March 1, 2021.

In 2019, J-Hope released a free collaboration single, "Chicken Noodle Soup", featuring American singer Becky G, on September 27. The track debuted at number 81 on the Billboard Hot 100, making J-Hope the first member of BTS to chart on the Hot 100 as a solo artist, the third Korean solo artist to rank on the chart (after Psy and CL), and the sixth Korean artist overall to do so. "Chicken Noodle Soup" also became J-Hope's second song to debut at number one on the World Digital Song Sales chart.

On June 14, 2022, Hybe Corporation announced that J-Hope would be the first member of BTS to begin promotions as a solo artist. His debut solo album Jack in the Box, released on July 15, was preceded by the lead single "More" on July 1. J-Hope made his performance debut at Lollapalooza on July 31, as the headlining act for the final day of the festival. He became the first South Korean artist to headline a main stage at a major United States music festival. In September, J-Hope featured on the single "Rush Hour" by Crush. He was nominated for six awards, including Artist of the Year and Song of the Year, at the MAMA Awards, and made his solo performance debut at the show as the headliner for day two of the event, on November 30. He also made his solo performance debut at Dick Clark's New Year's Rockin' Eve on December 31.

A documentary titled J-Hope in the Box, chronicling the making of J-Hope's debut album and his appearance at Lollapalooza, was released for streaming globally on Weverse and Disney+ in February 2023. He was announced as a brand ambassador for Louis Vuitton that same month. On February 26, Big Hit Music announced a new single by J-Hope, "On the Street", slated for release on March 3; the single is a collaboration with American rapper J. Cole.

Name 

His stage name, J-Hope, comes from his desire to represent hope for fans, as well as to be "the hope of BTS". It is also a reference to the myth of Pandora's box, as after the box was opened and all the evils inside were released to the world, the only thing left was hope.

Artistry and public image 
J-Hope has been described as having an upbeat and energetic tone to his music and performances. His mixtape, Hope World, was described as having a fun nature and variety of musical genres, including synth-pop, trap, house, alternative hip hop, funk-soul, and retro elements. In a review published by The 405, Emmad Usmani praised the mixtape's concept and production, writing "J-Hope showcases exceptional creativity, genuine personality, and a cohesive sense of direction over the 20 minutes of the project". Jeff Benjamin of Fuse wrote that the atmospheric style of "Blue Side", Hope World'''s outro track, "leaves the listener curious for what's coming next from J-Hope". The lyrical elements of the mixtape, notably the lead song "Daydream", was praised by Billboard for its discussion of the difficulties an idol faces in their career, various literary references, and fun presentation of the serious subject matter.

J-Hope cites the adventurous nature of Jules Verne's Twenty Thousand Leagues Under the Sea and the works of Kyle, Aminé, and Joey Badass as influencers on his style and work on Hope World. The idea of peace has also provided a basis for much of his lyrics, stating that "it'd be fantastic to become a part of someone's personal peace through my music" in an interview with Time magazine. The idea of "representing the modern generation" has also influenced his work on BTS' music. There was also a reference to Douglas Adams' science fiction series The Hitchhiker's Guide to the Galaxy''.

In January 2020, J-Hope was promoted to a full member of the Korea Music Copyright Association.

Impact 
In 2018, he was awarded the fifth-class Hwagwan Order of Cultural Merit by the President of South Korea along with the other members of the group. He had the most liked tweet in the world for 2018 when he posted the "In My Feelings Challenge".

In July 2021, he was appointed Special Presidential Envoy for Future Generations and Culture by President Moon Jae-in, along with the other members of BTS, to help "lead the global agenda for future generations, such as sustainable growth" and "expand South Korea's diplomatic efforts and global standing" in the international community.

Personal life 
In 2016, J-Hope purchased an apartment in South Korea worth US$1.6 million for his personal use. As of 2018, he lives in Hannam-dong, Seoul, South Korea with his bandmates.

Military service 
On February 26, 2023, Big Hit Music announced that J-Hope had filed a request for cancellation of the postponement of military service.

Philanthropy 

J-Hope has been a member of the "Green Noble Club", which recognizes high-value donors of Child Fund Korea, since 2018. On February 18, 2019, he donated ₩100 million (US$90,000) to the organization in support of those attending his high school alma mater in Gwangju. He previously donated ₩150 million ($135,000) in December 2018, but requested the donation be kept private at the time. In December 2019, he donated another ₩100 million. On November 17, 2020, he donated ₩100 million in support of children experiencing economic difficulties amid the COVID-19 pandemic. On February 18, 2021, he donated ₩150 million to support children with visual and hearing impairments. On May 4, for Children's Day, he donated ₩100 million for children affected by violence in Tanzania, Africa. In December, he donated another ₩100 million, to cover heating expenses for children in low-income families and childcare facilities, and for medical expenses of pediatric patients. J-Hope has donated a cumulative total of ₩800 million to Child Fund Korea since 2018.

Following the 2022 South Korean floods in Seoul, J-Hope donated  through the Hope Bridge Korea Disaster Relief Association to assist those affected. In February 2023, he donated , through the Korean UNICEF Committee, towards emergency relief for children affected by the Turkey–Syria earthquake.

Discography

Studio albums

Mixtapes

Singles

Other charted songs

As songwriter

Other songs

Filmography

Television

Music videos

Trailers and short films

Awards and nominations

Notes

References

External links 

1994 births
Living people
People from Gwangju
South Korean male rappers
South Korean record producers
South Korean hip hop record producers
South Korean singer-songwriters
South Korean male singer-songwriters
South Korean male idols
BTS members
Japanese-language singers of South Korea
English-language singers from South Korea
21st-century South Korean musicians
21st-century South Korean singers
Recipients of the Order of Cultural Merit (Korea)
Hybe Corporation artists